The Na+ Transporting Mrp Superfamily is a superfamily of integral membrane transport proteins.

It includes the TC families:

2.A.63 - The Monovalent Cation (K+ or Na+):Proton Antiporter-3 (CPA3) Family

3.D.1 - The H+ or Na+-translocating NADH Dehyrogenase (NDH) Family

3.D.9 - The H+-translocating F420H2 Dehydrogenase (F420H2DH) Family

Mrp of Bacillus subtilis is a 7 subunit Na+/H+ antiporter complex (TC# 2.A.63.1.4). All subunits are homologous to the subunits in other members of this monovalent cation (K+ or Na+):proton antiporter-3 (CPA3) family as well as subunits in the archaeal hydrogenases (TC#s 3.D.1.4.1 and 3.D.1.4.2), which share several subunits with NADH dehydrogenase subunits (3.D.1). The largest subunits of the Mrp complex (MrpA and MrpD) are homologous to subunits in NADH dehydrogenases (NDHs): ND2, ND4 and ND5 in the fungal NADH dehydrogenase complex and most other NDHs, as well as subunits in the F420H2 dehydrogenase of Methanosarcina mazei (TC#3.D.9.1.1). These homologous subunits may catalyze Na+/K+ and/or H+ transport.

See also 
 Transporter Classification Database

References 

Protein superfamilies
Membrane proteins
Transmembrane proteins
Transmembrane transporters
Transport proteins
Integral membrane proteins